510 Spadina (310 Spadina during overnight periods) is a Toronto streetcar route in Ontario, Canada, operated by the Toronto Transit Commission.

History

Earlier routes

Streetcar service on Spadina Avenue began in 1878 as a horsecar line operated by the Toronto Street Railway. In 1891, the Toronto Railway Company created a route called the Belt Line that ran as a loop along Spadina Avenue, Bloor Street, Sherbourne Street, and King Street. In 1923, the Toronto Transportation Commission reconfigured the streetcar network, discontinuing the Belt Line and creating Spadina as a separate streetcar route. The Spadina route operated until 1948, when it was replaced by buses. The tracks on Spadina between Dundas Street and Harbord Street were used by the Harbord streetcar route until its discontinuation in 1966, after which, only the tracks between King and College streets were retained for diversions along Spadina Avenue.

Modern route

The modern 510 Spadina route began as the 604 Harbourfront LRT route along Queens Quay in 1990, using CLRV and ALRV streetcars. The route was later renamed the 510 Harbourfront. It became the 510 Spadina and replaced the 77 Spadina bus when a new dedicated right-of-way was opened in 1997. The right-of-way extended the track north along Spadina Avenue from Queens Quay to Spadina station on the Bloor subway line.

The term "light-rail transit" (LRT), which had been adopted to project an image of modernity, was dropped when it led to residents and newspaper reporters imagining elevated guideways like those of the Scarborough RT running through their streets. It was found that the project was much easier to sell to the public and politicians when it was described as an improvement to the speed and reliability of traditional streetcar service.

In 2000, when the Queens Quay streetcar tracks were extended west to Bathurst and Fleet Streets, the name Harbourfront reappeared for a 509 Harbourfront route between Union and Exhibition Loop. The 509 and 510 routes share the trackage that had been used by the 604.

In 2005, The Globe and Mail newspaper published an article that criticized the switch to a dedicated right-of-way streetcar as being less beneficial than promised. Based on TTC documents, the author argued that service is about one minute slower (from Queens Quay to Bloor) during afternoon rush hour than in 1990. The author also cited TTC documents which show that the cost-to-revenue ratio of the route has fallen with the switch from buses to streetcars. Mitch Stambler, the TTC's manager of service planning, responded by pointing out that streetcars offer a smoother and quieter ride, zero emissions, and economic development.

Ridership increased from 26,000 per day on the 77 bus route to 35,000 per day on the Spadina streetcar in 2004 and to over 45,000 per day in 2005–2006. Streetcars on the Spadina portion run every 2–3 minutes every day.

On December 15, 2008, the next vehicle arrival notification system was installed for the 510 streetcar in the Spadina and Union subway stations. The next vehicle arrival notification system includes a display screen that shows the location of the streetcars in "real" time with a delay of one minute.

On June 18, 2012, all streetcar service on the line was suspended and replaced by buses. This was to allow major track work to be completed in preparation for the TTC's new low-floor Bombardier Transportation custom-made Flexity Outlook streetcars which were scheduled to enter service on the Spadina line in 2014. The upgrades were completed and full streetcar service was restored two years later on August 31, 2014, including a ceremony at 10:00am when the first two accessible low-floor Flexity vehicles officially entered revenue service.

On September 6, 2015, after a 13-year absence, the TTC reinstated its overnight service on this route. The night service was designated first as 317 Spadina (based on the overnight equivalent from the 77 Spadina bus era) before being renumbered 310 Spadina on September 3, 2017 (to better align with the current overnight equivalent of the 510 Spadina line), and was part of the expanded Blue Night Network streetcar services resulting from a $95 million investment from Toronto City Council. During overnight periods, streetcars operate approximately every 30 minutes. The TTC had operated an overnight service using buses on Spadina from 1987 until 1992 when it was discontinued due to a series of cutbacks in TTC service.

On May 14, 2018, 510 Spadina became the second streetcar route in Toronto (after 509 Harbourfront) to use a pantograph instead of the trolley pole for electrical pickup.

On May 10, 2021, the service was shortened to operate along Spadina Avenue from Spadina station to Queens Quay and Spadina only, to allow for an increase of service along the line. However, the 310 Spadina Blue Night service remained unchanged and continued to operate from Spadina station to Union station. On September 5, 2021, service to Union station resumed.

Route
510 streetcars operate entirely within dedicated streetcar rights-of-way, along Spadina Avenue, Queens Quay Boulevard and in a tunnel under Bay Street. Most stops along the routes are surface stops, with islands separating the regular traffic from the streetcar tracks, and have streetcar traffic signals, partial shelters, and railings to protect patrons from the traffic. Streetcars serve Union and Spadina subway stations from underground streetcar stations, and an additional underground streetcar station exists at Queens Quay on the approach to Union station.

As of November 21, 2021, the 510 Spadina route operates as three branches:

 510A Spadina: Spadina station to Union station
 510B Spadina: Spadina station to Queens Quay and Spadina Loop
 510C Spadina: Spadina station to Spadina Ave and King St.

Route 310 Spadina runs overnight between Spadina and Union stations, replacing the 510 Spadina service. It is part of the TTC's Blue Night Network, operating from approximately 1am to 5am.

Stop list

References

External links

 TTC route page for 510 Spadina
 TTC route page for 310 Spadina
 Route 510 - Spadina Streetcar (Transit Toronto)

Streetcar routes in Toronto
4 ft 10⅞ in gauge railways